"Mr. Custer" is a march novelty song, sung by Larry Verne, and written by Al De Lory, Fred Darian, and Joseph Van Winkle.

Background
It is a comical song about a soldier's plea to General Custer before the climactic Battle of the Little Bighorn against the Sioux, to allow him to stay behind, because he had a bad dream about the battle.

Chart performance
It was a No. 1 song in the United States in 1960, topping the Billboard Hot 100 singles chart for the issue dated October 10, 1960, and remained there for one week. On the US Hot R&B Sides chart, it went to No. 9. It reached No. 12 in Canada, also October 10, 1960.

In 1964, Verne recorded and released a sequel novelty song titled "Return of Mr. Custer," which used the same melody and music arrangement, but it failed to chart.

Reception 
In a retrospective review for his Number Ones column, Stereogum writer Tom Breihan panned the song, giving it one star out of ten while calling it "offensive", "morally wrongheaded", and "unlistenable musically".

Chart history

Weekly charts
Larry Verne

Charlie Drake

Ted Lune

Year-end charts

Sequel
A follow-up record, "Return of Mr. Custer (Please Mr. Sittin' Bull)" was released in 1964.

Cover versions
"Mr. Custer" was also a  success in the UK Singles Chart for Charlie Drake in 1960, his third such chart hit.
Novelty/country singer-songwriter Ray Stevens covered this song for his 1969 album Gitarzan.

See also
List of Hot 100 number-one singles of 1960 (U.S.)

References

1960 singles
Billboard Hot 100 number-one singles
Novelty songs
1960 songs
Songs about the military
Songs about military officers
Cultural depictions of George Armstrong Custer